The 1982 UCI Road World Championships - Women's Road Race took place on the 4th of september 1982 around Goodwood, Sussex in the United Kingdom. It was 61 km in length.

Mandy Jones broke clear of the field to win by 10 seconds. She was the first British woman to win a world championship for 15 years. She said:

"I won by accident. It was just plain daft. We were going downhill and I just rode past them. Then I looked back, saw I had a gap and kept going. I was praying my legs wouldn't collapse. But with around half a lap to go, I started thinking 'Hey, I could win this!"

Final classification

References

Women's Road Race
UCI Road World Championships – Women's road race
International cycle races hosted by England
1982 in women's road cycling